Pageauaspis is an extinct placoderm fish, which lived during the Devonian period of North America.

References

Placoderms of North America
Phlyctaeniidae
Devonian animals
Late Devonian animals